John Morse Haydon (January 27, 1920 – April 18, 1991) was the governor of the American Samoa from 1969 to 1974. Haydon attended the University of Washington. He served as a First Lieutenant in the United States Air Force during World War II and flew 35 combat missions over Germany. Haydon was commissioner of the Seattle Port Commission from 1960 to 1969, and president in 1963, 1968, and 1969. He was a member of the Governor's Advisory Council on Fisheries from 1965 to 1967, and on Commerce and Economic Development from 1965 to 1969. On August 1, 1969, he was appointed Governor of American Samoa by the Interior Secretary and he served until October 1974.

References

External links
 American Samoa.gov

1920 births
1991 deaths
Politicians from Billings, Montana
Politicians from Seattle
Military personnel from Montana
Governors of American Samoa
United States Army Air Forces soldiers
United States Army personnel of World War II
University of Washington alumni
American Samoa Republicans